A whorl ( or ) is an individual circle, oval, volution or equivalent in a whorled pattern, which consists of a spiral or multiple concentric objects (including circles, ovals and arcs).

Whorls in nature

For mollusc whorls, the body whorl in a mollusc shell is the most recently formed whorl of a spiral shell, terminating in the aperture.

Whorls in human-made objects

See also 

 Whirl (disambiguation)

References

Patterns
Geometric shapes